Muhammed Mayet (born 19 February 1998) is a South African cricketer. He made his first-class debut for Gauteng in the 2017–18 Sunfoil 3-Day Cup on 26 October 2017. He made his List A debut for Gauteng in the 2017–18 CSA Provincial One-Day Challenge on 29 October 2017.

In September 2018, he was named in Gauteng's squad for the 2018 Africa T20 Cup. He made his Twenty20 debut for Gauteng in the 2018 Africa T20 Cup on 14 September 2018.

References

External links
 

1998 births
Living people
South African cricketers
Gauteng cricketers
Place of birth missing (living people)